Ana Vitória Angélica Kliemaschewsk de Araújo (born 6 March 2000) is a Brazilian footballer who plays as a midfielder for Portuguese club Benfica and the Brazil national team.

Club career
Ana Vitória became the youngest footballer to score in the Campeonato Brasileiro de Futebol Feminino Série A1 in September 2015 when she scored for Mixto. In January 2019, she left Corinthians after two seasons and it was announced that she would join Benfica and be the first player to wear the number 10 shirt for the Portuguese club. On 15 July 2021, she renewed her contract with Benfica for a further two seasons, keeping her at the club until 2023.

International career
Ana Vitória made her debut for the Brazil national team on 2 December 2020 against Ecuador. She is also eligible to play for Poland through descent.

Honours
Benfica
 Campeonato Nacional Feminino: 2020–21
 Campeonato Nacional II Divisão: 2018–19
 Taça de Portugal: 2018–19
 Taça da Liga: 2019–20, 2020–21
 Supertaça de Portugal: 2019

References

2000 births
Living people
Women's association football midfielders
Brazilian women's footballers
Brazil women's international footballers
People from Rondonópolis
Sport Club Corinthians Paulista (women) players
S.L. Benfica (women) footballers
Brazilian expatriate sportspeople in Portugal
Campeonato Nacional de Futebol Feminino players
Expatriate women's footballers in Portugal
Brazilian people of Polish descent
Campeonato Brasileiro de Futebol Feminino Série A1 players
Brazilian expatriate women's footballers
Sportspeople from Mato Grosso